Stockholms ström (The Stream of Stockholm), also known as Strömmen (The Stream), in  Stockholm is the innermost part of Saltsjön, a bay of the Baltic Sea. It continues into Lake Mälaren through Norrström and Söderström.

See also
Geography of Stockholm
Rivers of Sweden

Geography of Stockholm
Lakes of Stockholm County